1855 in philosophy

Events

Publications 
 Søren Kierkegaard, The Moment

Births

Deaths 
 February 23 - Carl Friedrich Gauss (born 1777)
 November 11 - Søren Kierkegaard (born 1813)

Philosophy
19th-century philosophy
Philosophy by year